Sarfraz Ali may refer to:

 Sarfraz Ali (general) (1971–2022), Pakistani army officer
 Sarfraz Ali (murderer) (born c. 1977), convicted of the 2001 murder of Ross Parker